Persarai (stands for Persatuan Sepakbola Sabu Raijua) is a Indonesian football team based in Sabu Raijua Regency, East Nusa Tenggara. This team competes in Liga 3 East Nusa Tenggara Zone.

Notable players
 Jacklinus Dapa Ate
 Fernando Doni do Rego
 Fadamsyah Sanda
 Alwi Balawala
 Mayers Nau
 Abraham Wele

References

External links

Sabu Raijua Regency
Football clubs in Indonesia
Football clubs in East Nusa Tenggara
Association football clubs established in 2008
2008 establishments in Indonesia